El Libertador (Spanish for The Liberator) may refer to:

 Simón Bolívar (1783–1830), Venezuelan military and political leader
 El Libertador Air Base, a military airport and base in Venezuela
 El Libertador, Buenos Aires, a town in Buenos Aires, Argentina
 El Libertador station, a railway station on the Urquiza Line, Buenos Aires, Argentina
 "El libertador", a song by Ska-P from their 2008 album Lágrimas y gozos
 A summit in the Nevado de Cachi mountains of Argentina

See also
 Libertador (disambiguation)
 Libertadores